Turan Tovuz is an Azerbaijani football club based in Tovuz. The club won the Azerbaijan championship once, in 1994–1995. The club's home stadium is Tovuz City Stadium.

History
Founded by Vidadi Ahmedov on 23 February 1992, the club was the first Azerbaijani professional football club under the name of Turan Tovuz. However, since 1997, club found themselves slipping further and further down the table, which influenced by financial difficulties.

In 2011–12 season, ended with Turan in 11th position in Azerbaijan Premier League, the club's lowest ever league finish. In 2012–13 season, Turan for the first time in their history relegated to the Azerbaijan First Division, after twenty years in top flight.

In 2013, club's owners decided to change club's name to Turan-T. The club restored their name few months later.

Domestic history

European history
As of December 2008.

Stadium

Turan's home ground is Tovuz City Stadium, which has a capacity of 6,800.

Youth academy
Over the years, Turan has been a feeder team for the Azerbaijani national team, providing talented players like Elvin Mammadov, Nadir Nabiyev, Javid Huseynov and Budag Nasirov.

Honours
Azerbaijan Premier League
 Winners (1): 1993–94

Azerbaijan First Division
 Winners (1): 2016–17

Squad

Managers
''As of 1 November 2020.

 Zahid Huseynov (1992)
 Ruslan Abdullayev (1992–93)
 Kazbek Tuayev (1993–95)
 Khanoghlan Abbasov (1995–00)
 Boyukagha Aghayev (2000–01)
 Nizami Sadigov (2001–02)
 Naci Şensoy (2002–03)
 Nizami Sadigov (2003–04)
 Naci Şensoy (2004–05)
 Sakit Aliyev (2005–07)
 Salahattin Darvand (2007–08)
 Etimad Gurbanov (2008–09)
 Nizami Sadigov (2009–10)
 Sakit Aliyev (2010)
 Revaz Dzodzuashvili (2010)
 Naci Şensoy (2010–11)
 Asgar Abdullayev (July 2011 – 12 Oct)
 Afghan Talibov (2012–13)
 Nadir Nabiyev (2013–2014)
 Badri Kvaratskhelia (2014)
 Nizami Sadigov (2015–2016)
 Asgar Abdullayev (2016–2018)
 Eltay Aslanov (2018–2019)
 Ilham Yadullayev (2019–2021)
 Afghan Talibov (2021-2022)
 Aykhan Abbasov (2022-)

References .

External links
 Turan Tovuz at UEFA.COM
 Turan Tovuz at EUFO.DE
 Turan Tovuz at Weltfussball.de
 Turan Tovuz at Football-Lineups.com

 
Football clubs in Azerbaijan
Association football clubs established in 1992
1992 establishments in Azerbaijan